Collège de l'Acadie was a Francophone post-secondary community college in the Canadian provinces of Nova Scotia and Prince Edward Island with headquarters in the community of Tusket. Its Nova Scotia operations are now part of Université Sainte-Anne while its operations in Prince Edward Island were renamed Collège Acadie Île-du-Prince-Édouard and later Collège de l'Île.

History
Collège de l'Acadie was founded in August 1988 in the Canadian province of Nova Scotia as the Francophone community college for that province.  It subsequently expanded to Prince Edward Island in the 1990s under a joint-funding agreement between the two provincial governments. In 2003, the Nova Scotia operations of Collège de l'Acadie were merged with Université Sainte-Anne. The PEI operations became Collège de l'Île.

Its main campus and administration were headquartered in Tusket with satellite campuses in Francophone regions throughout Nova Scotia and Prince Edward Island until its merger with Sainte-Anne.

Campuses
Nova Scotia campuses
 Tusket, Yarmouth County
 Meteghan River, Digby County
 Pomquet, Antigonish County
 Dartmouth, Halifax County
 Petit-de-Grat, Richmond County
 Saint-Joseph-du-Moine, Inverness County

Prince Edward Island campuses
 Wellington, Prince County
 Charlottetown, Queens County
 Deblois, Prince County
 North Rustico, Queens County
 Souris, Kings County

2003-2008 restructuring
In 2003 the Nova Scotia operations of Collège de l'Acadie were merged into the Université Sainte-Anne which is headquartered at Pointe-de-l'Église, however, the Prince Edward Island operations continued under the name Collège Acadie Île-du-Prince-Édouard.  On June 23, 2008 the college was granted official status by the Legislative Assembly of Prince Edward Island.

References

Programs
The college offered technical and professional programs and all campuses are equipped with distance education systems such as audiographic conference systems and videoconference systems, as well as access to the Internet.

External links
 Collège Acadie Île-du-Prince-Édouard
 Université Sainte-Anne, Études collégiales

Colleges in Nova Scotia
Colleges in Prince Edward Island
Educational institutions established in 1988
Education in Digby County, Nova Scotia
Education in Yarmouth County
Education in Antigonish County, Nova Scotia
Education in Halifax, Nova Scotia
Education in Richmond County, Nova Scotia
Education in Inverness County, Nova Scotia
Education in Prince County, Prince Edward Island
Education in Queens County, Prince Edward Island
Education in Kings County, Prince Edward Island
Acadia
1988 establishments in Canada
2003 disestablishments in Nova Scotia